Louise Wüste or Wueste, née Heuser (6 June 1805,  Gummersbach - 25 September 1874, Eagle Pass, Texas) was a German-American portrait artist; associated with the Düsseldorfer Malerschule.

Life and work 
She was the first of six children born to the paint and wine merchant, Heinrich Daniel Theodor Heuser (1767–1848), and his wife, Katharina Luisa née Jügel (1776–1841). Her grandfather, was the founder of a large trading company. Her aunt, Henriette Jügel, taught her how to paint and draw, and her mother taught her how to play the harp. Her sisters, Adeline and Alwine also became painters. Another sister, Ida (1817-1880), married the painter Karl Friedrich Lessing in 1841. 

In 1824, she married Dr. Peter Wilhelm Leopold Wüste (1795–1832), a frequent guest for musical evenings at the Heuser household. They had two daughters and a son. After Peter's death, she and her children went to live with her parents. There, she established a small painting school for girls. In 1848, after her father's death, she went to live with her daughter, Adeline (1828-1912), who had married an estate manager, Heino Staffel (1818–1904). It was then she decided to take formal art lessons. She therefore went to Düsseldorf, where she studied privately with Friedrich Boser, Karl Ferdinand Sohn, and her brother-in-law, Lessing. 

Adeline and her family emigrated to the United States in 1851; settling in San Antonio, Texas. Through the remainder of the 1850s, she lived in Cologne. Then, in 1859, her other daughter, Emma, also emigrated to the United States; settling in Pleasanton, near San Antonio. She soon followed, and went to live with Adeline again. There, she opened a portrait studio. She also devoted herself to sketching Texan and Mexican-American scenes. 

The outbreak of the Civil War severely reduced her income, but she was able to buy a small house in Eagle Pass, not far from her son, Daniel (1830-1882), who had also emigrated and become a merchant. Her later sketches focus on the people and places along the Rio Grande. Most of her works are in private collections, or still in the possession of their subjects' families. The largest public collection is held by the Witte Museum, in San Antonio.

References

Further reading 
 Jochen Schmidt-Liebich: Lexikon der Künstlerinnen 1700–1900. K. G. Saur Verlag, München 2005, pg.197 (Online)
 Pauline A. Pickney: Painting in Texas: The Nineteenth Century. University of Texas Press, Austin/TX 1967
 Doris O. Dawdy: Artists of the American West. Vol. I, Swallow Press, Chicago 1974 
 Hans Paffrath (Ed.): Lexikon der Düsseldorfer Malerschule 1819–1918. Vol.3: Nabert–Zwecker. Kunstmuseum Düsseldorf and the Galerie Paffrath, Bruckmann, Munich 1998, pg. 242

External links 

 James Patrick McGuire: Wueste, Louise Heuser, Biography @ the Texas State Historical Association
 Wueste, more works @ the University of Texas at San Antonio, Digital Collection

1805 births
1874 deaths
German painters
German portrait painters
Painters from Texas
German emigrants to the United States
People from Gummersbach